"Pop Star" is a song by Japanese singer Ken Hirai. The single went on to top the 2005 Oricon Charts and is known for its remarkable music video, featuring Ken in seven different personas, including a raccoon and his own manager. The Video also helped Ken break into the US and Canadian Markets where Stations would play the video despite the fact that it was in Japanese. The song was featured in the Nintendo DS game, Moero! Nekketsu Rhythm Damashii Osu! Tatakae! Ouendan 2, as well as on Taiko No Tatsujin 8 and Taiko No Tatsujin Portable 2 for the PSP. It is also a track in the Konami's jubeat ripples series. Its latest appearance is in the Namco game Happy Dance Collection for the Nintendo Wii. The song was also featured in the Japanese drama Kiken na Aneki starring Ito Misaki.

References

2005 singles
Ken Hirai songs
Oricon Weekly number-one singles
Japanese television drama theme songs
Song recordings produced by Seiji Kameda
Defstar Records singles
Songs written by Ken Hirai